The British Esports Federation (also known as British Esports) is the national body for esports (or competitive video gaming) in the United Kingdom. It was established in March 2016 to help develop the UK's grassroots esports scene and provide an infrastructure to nurture future talent.

Organization
The association's chair is Andy Payne OBE, who has worked for the Mastertronic software publishing group, AppyNation, Just Flight and is a board member of UKIE, the trade body for the UK games industry. Former Minister and MP Ed Vaizey joined the association as vice chair in October 2017. Andy Miah joined as advisory board member in November 2019.

History
In April 2017, British Esports announced its first game advisers, who provide input and expertise to make sure the association can support and understand each game's community effectively.

The Association held an after-school esports club pilot scheme for school children at Maida Vale Library in Summer 2017.

British Esports joined Ukie in early 2018, the Creative Industries Federation and the Sport and Recreation Alliance, as well as being a prominent member of the Global Esports Federation.

In early 2018, the inaugural British Esports Championships were announced. The pilot Championships for schools and colleges ran from February to April 2018 and the first full Championships ran from October 2018, in partnership with Twitch Student and AoC Colleges Sport, concluding with finals at the Insomnia Gaming Festival in 2019. Following a rebrand in 2021, the British Esports Student Champs runs in two splits (Winter and Spring) across the academic year for students to compete for a spot at the live grand finals event. The 2022 Grand Finals are set to be held in conjunction with the Confetti Institute of Creative Technologies in Nottingham.

In September 2018, British Esports teamed up with West Ham United Foundation, London Sport, Archery GB and GAME to host an activity week merging esports with sport, including football, archery and Rocket League.

In December 2021, Team Great Britain and Northern Ireland competed in the first-ever Global Esports Games in Singapore. Teams competed in Dota 2, Street Fighter V, and eFootball PES against one another, with the Dota 2 Women's team coming home with a silver medal at the end of the event.

In January 2022, it was announced that British Esports will be opening the National Esports Performance Centre in Sunderland. The campus will act as a headquarters for the organisation, and will allow for further developments to the esports scene throughout the United Kingdom.

In February 2022, it was announced that the pilot for the Commonwealth Esports Championships is being supported by British Esports. The tournament will take place alongside the Commonwealth Games in Birmingham in July 2022.

References

External links

Esports governing bodies
2016 establishments in the United Kingdom
Department for Digital, Culture, Media and Sport
Esports in the United Kingdom